This is a list of Gaelic football and hurling clubs in County Mayo.

List of clubs

GAA
 List
Mayo